The 2030 Commonwealth Games, officially known as the XXIV Commonwealth Games, will be held in 2030 for members of the Commonwealth. 2030 will mark the centenary of the Games, first held as the British Empire Games, which has been held under various names (British Empire and Commonwealth Games, British Commonwealth Games and finally Commonwealth Games) on a quadrennial basis ever since, save for the Games cancelled due to World War II.

Host city bids

Possible
  Alberta, Canada

 A potential bid from the Canadian province of Alberta, predominantly featuring Calgary and Edmonton, has been mooted instead of Hamilton for the 2030 Commonwealth Games

  India
Indian Olympic Association had approached Central Government in December 2022 for hosting next edition of Commonwealth Games.

Cancelled
  Hamilton, Ontario, Canada

 A group of Hamilton businessmen planned a bid for the 2030 edition of the Commonwealth Games to mark 100 years since the city hosted the original games, but also briefly considered the 2026 edition when it became apparent there would be little other competition to host. But in April 2021, the spokesperson and chair for the Hamilton bid, Lou Frapporti, announced that Hamilton would scrap any bid for the 2026 edition and resume focusing on the 2030 edition instead. Frapporti stated that the reason for resuming focusing on 2030 was because the province of Ontario was unlikely to support the 2026 bid due the fact that the 2026 FIFA World Cup is scheduled to have games in Toronto and the unlikelihood of the CGF alternatively allowing for a move to 2027. Brian MacPherson, CEO of the Commonwealth Games Canada proposed Canada to host the 2030 games as it hosted the inaugural British Empire Games in 1930 and would mark the 100th anniversary of the games. It was later reported that the organizing committee plans to ask to be given the right to host the 2030 Commonwealth Games without having to go through a formal bid process.

References

External links
Resurgent Commonwealth agrees to begin the process of selecting 2026 and 2030 Commonwealth Games Host Cities
CGF to begin the selection of 2026 & 2030 Commonwealth Games Host Cities
 

Commonwealth Games